Jorge Correia Reixa  (born 18 August 1993) is a forward who play as a winger for Polish club Zyrardowianka Zyrardow. He previously played for Zawisza Bydgoszcz in the II liga. Born in Guinea Bissau, Reixa is a youth international for Portugal.

Career
Reixa started playing football in England for Stafford U13 Academy FC before he joined English youth side Clapton, making his senior league and youth FA Cup debut. He developed there as a boy, then left for Grays Athletic. Reixa later joined Boreham Wood, and the Swiss club Le Mont, where he played for the B team.  He was later signed by Zawisza Bydgoszcz, who loaned him to Zyrardowianka Zyrardow for the 2015-16 season.

Personal life
Reixa was born in Guinea-Bissau to Pedro Miquel Correia Reixa from Guinea-Bissau and Ana Maria Mendes Nigerian.  Both of his parents are Portuguese citizens. He has three brothers and two sisters. 

.

References

External links
 At grodzisksportnews.pl
 At 90minut.pl
 At warkaks.futbolowo.pl

1993 births
Living people
Sportspeople from Bissau
Portuguese footballers
Portugal youth international footballers
Association football forwards
Expatriate footballers in Poland
Bissau-Guinean emigrants to Portugal
Portuguese people of Bissau-Guinean descent
Portuguese people of Nigerian descent
Portuguese sportspeople of African descent
Bissau-Guinean people of Nigerian descent
Sportspeople of Nigerian descent
Grays Athletic F.C. players
Boreham Wood F.C. players
FC Le Mont players
Zawisza Bydgoszcz players